Statistics of Kuwaiti Premier League for the 1989–90 season.

Overview
It was contested by 8 teams, and Al Jahra won the championship.

League standings

References
Kuwait - List of final tables (RSSSF)

1990
1989–90 in Asian association football leagues
1